Dahaneh (also known as Dahaneh-ye Yek) is a village in Jafarbay-ye Gharbi Rural District, Gomishan District, Torkaman County, Golestan Province, Iran. At the 2006 census, its population was 1,197, in 221 families.

References 

Populated places in Torkaman County